The 2017 EuroEyes Cyclassics was a road cycling one-day race that took place on 20 August. It was the 22nd edition of the EuroEyes Cyclassics and the 31st race of the 2017 UCI World Tour. It was won by Elia Viviani in the sprint.

Teams
As the EuroEyes Cyclassics was a UCI World Tour event, all eighteen UCI WorldTeams were invited automatically and obliged to enter a team in the race. Three UCI Professional Continental teams – ,  and  – competed, completing the 21-team peloton.

Result

References

External links

2017
2017 UCI World Tour
2017 in German sport
August 2017 sports events in Germany